Marc Trillard (born 1955 in Baden-Baden) is a French writer.

He publishes his contributions to many titles in the French press. He is also author of documentaries for radio France Culture and France 3 television.

He settled in Brazil in 2010.

Work 
1988: Un exil, R. Deforges, 
1999: Coup de lame, R. Deforges, Éditions du Seuil
1994: Eldorado 51, Éditions Phébus
1995: Tête de cheval, Phébus
1996: Cabotage : à l'écoute des chants des îles du cap vert, Phébus
1998: Madagascar, Marcus
1999: Cuba : en attendant l'année prochaine, Vilo
2000: Si j'avais quatre dromadaires, Phébus
2001: Campagne dernière, Phébus
2003: Le maître et la mort, Éditions Gallimard
2006 De sabres et de feu, Le Cherche Midi,
2006: Amazonie, rencontre avec un géant, Éditions du Rocher
2011: Les Mamiwatas, Actes Sud
2016: L’Anniversaire du roi, Actes Sud

Literary prizes 
Prix Interallié 1994 for Eldorado 51
Prix Louis-Guilloux 1998 for Coup de lame

External links 
 Marc Trillard : cap sur l'Asie on La Dépêche.fr
 L’Anniversaire du roi, de Marc Trillard on Le Monde
 LES MAMIWATAS DE MARC TRILLARD on Afrikavision
 "Les Mamiwatas" on YouTube

20th-century French non-fiction writers
21st-century French non-fiction writers
Prix Interallié winners
Prix Louis Guilloux winners
1955 births
People from Baden-Baden
Living people